"Tal Vez, Quizá" is a song performed by Mexican singer Paulina Rubio, taken from her fifth studio album Paulina (2000). The song was written by Armando Manzanero, and produced by Marcello Azevedo. Lyrically, the song talks about a woman who asks her lover to stay with her, narrating from her perspective the feelings and emotions of being the second choice in an extramarital affair.

It peaked at #42 in the Billboard Hot Latin Songs chart.

Format 
Mexican CD Single
 "Tal Vez, Quizá" – 4:33

Charts

References

2001 singles
Paulina Rubio songs
Spanish-language songs
Pop ballads
Universal Music Latino singles
Songs written by Armando Manzanero